Bernard Meynadier (born 19 April 1938) is a French rower. He competed at the 1960 Summer Olympics in Rome with the men's eight where they came fourth.

References

1938 births
Living people
French male rowers
Olympic rowers of France
Rowers at the 1960 Summer Olympics
Sportspeople from Saint-Germain-en-Laye
World Rowing Championships medalists for France
Rowers at the 1964 Summer Olympics
European Rowing Championships medalists